Leira is a village in the municipality of Indre Fosen in Trøndelag county, Norway. Rissa Church is located on the south side of Leira.

Name
The name is derived from leire which means 'clay'. Leira is a common name of rivers many places in Norway.

References

Villages in Trøndelag
Indre Fosen